Calverton Park is a city in St. Louis County, Missouri, United States. The population was 1,293 at the 2010 census.

Geography
Calverton Park is located at  (38.765827, -90.315416).

Calverton Park is surrounded by three other St. Louis County municipalities: Ferguson, Florissant and Hazelwood.

Demographics

2010 census
At the 2010 census there were 1,293 people, 496 households, and 347 families living in the village. The racial makup of the village was 53.4% White, 42.2% African American, 0.2% Native American, 0.9% Asian, 1.1% from other races, and 2.2% from two or more races. Hispanic or Latino of any race were 2.9%.

Of the 496 households 35.3% had children under the age of 18 living with them, 39.9% were married couples living together, 24.4% had a female householder with no husband present, 5.6% had a male householder with no wife present, and 30.0% were non-families. 24.4% of households were one person and 9% were one person aged 65 or older. The average household size was 2.61 and the average family size was 3.08.

The median age in the village was 36.4 years. 25.2% of residents were under the age of 18; 9.1% were between the ages of 18 and 24; 27.4% were from 25 to 44; 26.2% were from 45 to 64; and 12.1% were 65 or older. The gender makeup of the village was 47.2% male and 52.8% female.

2000 census
At the 2000 census there were 1,322 people, 494 households, and 345 families living in the village. The racial makup of the village was 74.96% White, 22.24% African American, 0.23% Native American, 0.30% Asian, 0.30% from other races, and 1.97% from two or more races. Hispanic or Latino of any race were 0.83%.

Of the 494 households 34.2% had children under the age of 18 living with them, 47.6% were married couples living together, 19.2% had a female householder with no husband present, and 30.0% were non-families. 24.3% of households were one person and 9.5% were one person aged 65 or older. The average household size was 2.68 and the average family size was 3.22.

The age distribution was 28.8% under the age of 18, 8.9% from 18 to 24, 28.7% from 25 to 44, 19.2% from 45 to 64, and 14.4% 65 or older. The median age was 35 years. For every 100 females, there were 90.8 males. For every 100 females age 18 and over, there were 87.8 males.

The median household income was $44,632 and the median income for a family was $49,375. Males had a median income of $34,500 versus $26,875 for females. The per capita income for the village was $25,723. About 8.1% of families and 9.1% of the population were below the poverty line, including 15.4% of those under age 18 and none of those age 65 or over.

Education
Walnut Grove Elementary School of the Ferguson-Florissant School District is located in Calverton Park.

Police
Calverton Park is served by the Calverton Park Police Department. The CPPD is dispatched by the neighboring city of Ferguson.

Calverton Park draws 66 percent of its revenue from fines and fees on the local population, which represents the highest percentage of any municipality in St. Louis County.

CPPD is a small police force that has a command staff of a Chief, Captain, Sergeant, and Corporal. They have several officers and reserve officers working around 30 hours a month.

References

External links
 Village of Calverton Park

Cities in St. Louis County, Missouri
Cities in Missouri